The Serdyukov reform, named after its originator, Defence Minister Anatoly Serdyukov, was a major structural reorganisation of the Russian Armed Forces that began in 2009.

Significant reforms of the Russian Armed Forces were announced in October 2008 under Defence Minister Anatoliy Serdyukov, and major structural reorganisation began in early 2009. The stated aims of the reform are to reorganize the structure and the chain of command in the Russian army, and to reduce it in size.

Key elements of the reforms announced in October 2008 included:
 reducing the armed forces to a strength of one million by 2012;
 reducing the number of officers;
 centralising officer training from 65 military schools into 10 'systemic' military training centres;
 creating a professional NCO corps;
 reducing the size of the central command;
 introducing more civilian logistics and auxiliary staff;
 elimination of cadre-strength formations;
 reorganising the reserves; reorganising the army into a brigade system;
 reorganising air forces into an air base system instead of regiments.

There had previously been several reform attempts such as the 1997 plan under defence minister Igor Sergeyev and the 2003 programme of President Putin (‘Urgent Tasks for the Development of the Armed Forces of the Russian Federation’), the latter of which was very similar to the 2008 programme, as it emphasized already the need for reductions in personnel strength, a gradual decrease in the use of conscripts in favour of professional soldiers, the creation of a professional NCO corps and drastic changes to officer training and education. The 2003 program moved at a very slow pace, mainly due to the unwillingness of the military to reform.

Personnel strength
An essential part of the military reform is its downsizing. By the beginning of the reform, there were about 1.13 million active personnel in the Russian Armed Forces. The planned reduction to 1 million servicemen will be advanced from 2016 to 2022. Largely, the reductions falls within the officers. They used to account for about one third of the total strength of the Armed Forces: this will be reduced to 15%.

The enlisted men are to be reduced according to the table:

On April 4, 2011 General-Colonel Vasily Smirnov, Deputy Chief of the General Staff, said that the reformed forces would consist of 220,000 officers, 425,000 contract servicemen and 300,000 conscript soldiers.

NCO Corps
An important element of the reforms is the creation of a professional NCO corps. Such a corps would serve as the basis for soldier training and military discipline. The NCO corps will consist of specialists with almost 3 years (2 years and 10 months) of training. The first new NCO Training Center was established in December 2009 at the Ryazan Institute for Airborne Troops. The future NCOs will occupy the posts of commanders and deputy commanders of motor rifle, reconnaissance, airborne, and motor transport platoons, as well as company and battery first sergeants. It is planned to have 2,000 candidates annually.

However, the introduction of sergeants into the system will take not 3–4 years as envisaged, but at least 10–15. This delay could undermine reform by creating problems with management and the manning of those combat arms where a relatively high percentage of officers are involved in the direct operation of military equipment, such as the submarine fleet, air-defense forces, etc.

Military districts
From 1992 to 2010, the Russian Ground Forces were divided into seven military districts:
 Leningrad Military District;
 Moscow Military District;
 Volga-Urals Military District;
 North Caucasus Military District;
 Siberian Military District;
 Far East Military District;
 Kaliningrad Special Region. (formed in 1997)

In mid 2010, a reorganisation was announced which would consolidate military districts and the navy's fleets into four Joint Strategic Commands (OSK). Geographically divided, the four commands will be:

 Joint Strategic Command West – Western Military District (HQ in Saint Petersburg), includes the Baltic Fleet and Kaliningrad region;
 Joint Strategic Command South – Southern Military District (HQ in Rostov-on-Don), includes the Black Sea Fleet and Caspian Flotilla;
 Joint Strategic Command Center – Central Military District (HQ in Yekaterinburg);
 Joint Strategic Command East – Eastern Military District (HQ in Khabarovsk), includes the Pacific Fleet.

In 2014, the decision to give the Northern Fleet more autonomy was made and a fifth strategic command was established:
 Joint strategic Command North – Northern Fleet Joint Strategic Command (HQ in Severomorsk), Northern Fleet is the main component of the command.

"Serdyukov's Defense Ministry will also be putting some soon-to-be-vacant real estate up for sale, e.g., Moscow MD headquarters (Polina Osipenko Street, Moscow), Far East MD headquarters (Seryshev Street, Khabarovsk). The initial asking prices for these buildings and land will be several billion U.S. dollars. As long planned, proceeds from these sales, along with the sale of the Navy Main Staff, military educational institutions, and other military establishments in Moscow, are supposed to fund construction of housing for servicemen as well as military garrison infrastructure in new army deployment locations."

Ground Forces
Before the 2008 reform, the Russian Ground Forces (SV) had 24 divisions, namely 3 tank divisions, 16 motorized rifle divisions and 5 machine gun artillery divisions, as well as two division-strength military bases in Armenia and Tajikistan, and 12 independent brigades. Out of those 24 divisions, only 5 motorised rifle-divisions were at full strength in 2008. Only about 13% of the army units could be deemed permanently combat-ready.

It was announced that every tank or motorized-rifle division will be split, as a rule, into two brigades. This process began in October 2008 with the splitting of the 2nd Guards Tamanskaya Motor Rifle Division near Moscow. By the end of 2009, 23 of the 24 divisions had been disbanded and their elements were used to create 4 tank brigades, 35 motorized rifle brigades (10 of which were pre-existing) and one "fortifications" brigade. All the brigades are permanent-readiness forces.

Almost all brigades are now designated otdelnaya (separate), with several units retaining the "Guards" honorific. The only remaining division is the 18th Machine Gun Artillery Division on the Kuril Islands.

The number of military units and formations in the Ground Forces will be reduced from 1,890 to 172 within three years. The original four-link command and control system (military district – army – division – regiment) has been replaced by a three-link system (military district – operational command – brigade).

Air Forces
The number of units in the Russian Air Force (VVS) will be reduced from 340 to 180. The number of air bases will be reduced from 245 to 52. The Air Force plans to eliminate the reduced, two-squadron aviation regiments (those with 24 combat aircraft per regiment). The new organization of the VVS establishes the Air Base as the basic structural element.

Each air base will include an HQ, 1–7 air squadrons (or aviation groups), an airfield service battalion and communication units. The Belarusian Air Force currently uses the same structure. All Aviation Division HQs have been disbanded. The Air Bases receive their orders from the seven new Aviation Commands:

 Operative-Strategic Aerospace Defence Command (former Special Purpose Command and 16th Air Army)
 Long Range Aviation Command (former 37th Air Army)
 Military Transport Aviation Command (former 61st Air Army)
 1st Air and Air Defence Forces Command of the Joint Strategic Command West (former 6th Air Army)
 2nd Air and Air Defence Forces Command of the Joint Strategic Command East (former 11th Air Army)
 3rd Air and Air Defence Forces Command of the Joint Strategic Command Center (former 14th Air Army)
 4th Air and Air Defence Forces Command of the Joint Strategic Command South (former 4th and 5th Air Armies)

All the air defence divisions and corps of the Air Defence Forces (PVO), which were part of the Air Force since 1998, have been disbanded and replaced by 13 aerospace defence brigades. These new brigades have been distributed among the seven commands, and consist of fighter aviation air bases, SAM regiments and radar regiments.

The Gagarin and Zhukovskiy air force academies have been merged into the new Zhukovskiy-Gagarin Air Force Academy in Monino.

Navy
The number of Russian Navy (VMF) units will be cut almost by half, from 240 to 123 units. The navy's fighting capability will be bolstered by bringing various units to 100% of their full wartime strength. Other planned changes are the offloading of non-military assets such as housing, the outsourcing of some jobs to civilian contractors and a reduction of the number of non-combat officers.

The Fleets have been subordinated to the new Operational Strategic Commands: the Northern and Baltic Fleets are part of the Western Military District, the Black Sea Fleet and Caspian Flotilla are part of the Southern Military District, and the Pacific Fleet is part of the Eastern Military District.

Under the State Armament Program, 100 warships will be procured by 2020. The purchase of 20 submarines, 35 corvettes and 15 frigates is planned. For example 6 to 8 Project 885 SSNs and 6 Project 636.

The Navy's schools and research institutes have been merged into a territorially distributed Naval Academy Research and Training Center which consists of the Naval Academy, the Higher Special Officer Courses, five naval research institutes, three MOD research institutes, the Nakhimov Naval School in St. Petersburg and the Naval Cadet Corps.

The Naval Aviation and the support units were reorganized into 13 air bases, which were merged into territorially integrated structures in a second stage. As is the case for the reformed Air Force, each new air base consists of an HQ, support units and one or more aviation groups (the former air bases).

Several units of the Naval Infantry have changed their status. The 61st Separate Naval Infantry Brigade of the Northern Fleet has become a regiment, the 810th Regiment of the Black Sea Fleet has become a brigade, the 55th Division of the Pacific Fleet has been disbanded and replaced by the 155th Separate Naval Infantry Brigade, and the 77th Brigade of the Caspian Flotilla was disbanded too.

Airborne Troops
Initially it was planned to transform the four existing divisions of the Airborne Troops (VDV) into 7 to 8 air-assault brigades, among a number of other cuts and changes which drew of lot of protest of reserve and active airborne troopers who feared a loss of status.

However general Shamanov, who was appointed as the new CinC of the VDV in May 2009 and who generally supports the reform programme, cancelled all cuts and changes in the VDV and announced that the airborne troops would be reinforced.

MOD Serdyukov announced that he does not see the need to create independent rapid-reaction forces. "The Armed Forces already have such units in the VDV. They will be strengthened, and each military district will have an Airborne brigade to carry out urgent missions and operations under unpredictable circumstances."

The divisions have been beefed up and there are now four independent airborne/air-assault brigades.

Strategic Missile Troops
The Strategic Missile Troops (RVSN) will retain 8 missile divisions in place of twelve missile divisions.

Space Troops
The number of units/formations of the Russian Space Forces (KV) will be reduced from 7 to 6.

Reform of military education
The centralization and downsizing of the military education system is closely related to planned reductions to the officer corps. The Russian military education system had been based upon the previous set of Soviet military academies. Serdyukov announced that the 65 military institutions of higher learning (15 academies, four universities, 46 colleges – including Suvorov and Nakhimov schools – and institutes) will be reduced by 2012 to just ten "systemic institutions": three research and teaching centers, six academies and one university. The new institutions will not only serve to train officers, but also to conduct research. They will be established according to territory, not combat arm. For now, all existing facilities will become affiliates of these ten centers; decisions regarding potential closures will be taken later. Serdyukov affirmed that the entire faculty of existing military institutes will be preserved and absorbed into the new system, and that only the managerial layer will be reduced. He also said that many formerly military specializations, such as lawyers, will now be educated at civilian facilities.

Closure of military towns
When Serdyukov became the Minister of Defence, Russia had 27,000 fortified settlements/military bases, that were in practice closed towns. The reform of 2008 reduced this number to 500. The problems with this started when the search started for alternative owners. Mostly the local councils were obliged to take them over but this created issues that made local councils reluctant. There was no decent oversight over the residents, many towns contained large criminal or homeless element that the local law enforcement was unable to touch since the closed establishment was under military jurisdiction. Also the residential and infrastructure was in a poor shape and locals councils did not have resources to fix. As long as these towns were under control of military, residents from these establishments could make written complaints. Most of these complaints however disappeared, were ignored or simply were not replied. Mostly complaining was useless and responsible people with power to change anything were not reachable. Local council, who after Serdyukov's 2008 reforms had to take over, is however reachable. Considering the residents of these towns also gained right to participate local elections after military's withdrawal, most of the local councils management did not want to take them over at all.

Bringing finances under control and reducing power of General Staff
Despite significant raise in the defence spending before Serdyukov became MOD, the better funding was not visible because it had vaporised. Apparently the first task of Serdyukov was to established control over flow of finances, explaining why he created financial control department in MOD and staffing it with people from Federal Tax Service of Russia. This strained already explosive relations between Serdyukov and General Staff of the Armed Forces of the Russian Federation further since traditionally everything defence related was under General Staff's control. Dismissal of General Yuri Baluyevsky from General Staff, implementing reforms in 2008 and promoting of General Nikolay Yegorovich Makarov was salami tactics style of cutting power from the General Staff. Next step was to reduce massive maintenance costs since Russian military before Serdyukov's reforms was just a downsized version of Soviet Armed Forces. Since 1991, there had been many plans to reform Russian Armed Forces to post-soviet level and make more suitable for Russian national defence needs, however due to the resistance from General Staff and exciting structures, most of them were implemented only by name. Reform of 2008 was the first clearly implemented reform where General Staff's resistance was broken.

There are multiple samples of mismanagement of funds under General Staff. Most of the famous incident is with the Russian submarine Ekaterinburg (K-84). On 29 December 2011 around 1220 UTC, Ekaterinburg caught fire while in the floating drydock PD-50. As per some date, 3 fires happened on that day and last one did spin out of control, creating dangerous incident with the weaponry on board, including nuclear weapons. Officials initially confirmed that all weaponry was moved from the Ekaterinburg before but Deputy Prime Minister Rogozin lead the investigation personally and concluded Ekaterinburg “did not unload the ammunition set for repair: there were torpedoes on it, and regular ballistic missiles.”  Partially reason for Moscow's dissatisfaction was that for that there had been funds released to remove the armaments from Ekaterinburg for the duration of repairs but these most likely disappeared. 

Another issue was ammunition storage and ammunition dump explosions, such as Severomorsk Disaster that did have a risk occurring once in a while. Before 2008 reforms Russian military industry did utilise 150 000 tons of ammunition a year. By 2011, there was 4,5 million tons of obsolete ammunition in storage at ammunition depots. Some of the obsolete ammunition in storage was made in 1920s for artillery and there was also ammunition for T-34, that had been already phased out from Russian Armed Forces. By the end of 2012, they have blown up Russian military's training fields with 3,6 million tons of this ammo. Russian military industry, who had been responsible for storing this ammo, did not like this since it did hurt their business.

References

Further reading 
 Dall'Agnol, Augusto C.  (2019).

Military of Russia
21st-century military history of Russia
Military reform
Military reform
Russia
Reform in Russia
Dmitry Medvedev